Actinoplanes utahensis is a species of bacteria and a source of the drug acarbose, an alpha-glucosidase inhibitor used in the treatment of diabetes mellitus.

Description
A. utahensis are irregular in size and shape. They form sporangia which are 5 to 18 micrometers in diameter, and contain spores arranged in irregular coils. A. utahensis are motile by way of a number of flagella at one end.

History
A. utahensis was originally identified by John Couch from soils collected from Salt Lake City's Liberty Park as well as along U.S. Route 40 in Nevada.

References

External links 
 Type strain of Actinoplanes utahensis at BacDive –  the Bacterial Diversity Metadatabase

Micromonosporaceae
Bacteria described in 1963